The men's decathlon event at the 2008 African Championships in Athletics was held at the Addis Ababa Stadium on April 30–May 1.

Medalists

Results

100 metres
Wind: 0.0 m/s

Long jump

Shot put

High jump

400 metres

110 metres hurdles
Wind: -2.4 m/s

Discus throw

Pole vault

Javelin throw

1500 metres

Final standings

References
Results (Archived)

2008 African Championships in Athletics
Combined events at the African Championships in Athletics